Massachusetts House of Representatives' 8th Plymouth district in the United States is one of 160 legislative districts included in the lower house of the Massachusetts General Court. It covers parts of Bristol County and Plymouth County. Republican Angelo D'Emilia of Bridgewater has represented the district since 2011.

Towns represented
The district includes the following localities:
 Bridgewater
 Raynham

The current district geographic boundary overlaps with that of the Massachusetts Senate's 1st Plymouth and Bristol district.

Former locales
The district previously covered:
 Lakeville, circa 1872 
 Mattapoisett, circa 1872 
 Rochester, circa 1872

Representatives
 Jonathan H. Holmes, circa 1858 
 Job T. Tobey, circa 1859 
 Sidney T. Nelson, circa 1888 
 C. Gerald Lucey, circa 1951 
 Arthur Joseph Sheehan, circa 1951 
 Peter Y. Flynn, circa 1975 
 David Flynn, circa 2010
 Angelo L. D'Emilia, 2011-current

See also
 List of Massachusetts House of Representatives elections
 Other Plymouth County districts of the Massachusetts House of Representatives: 1st, 2nd, 3rd, 4th, 5th, 6th, 7th,  9th, 10th, 11th, 12th
 List of Massachusetts General Courts
 List of former districts of the Massachusetts House of Representatives

Images
Portraits of legislators

References

External links
 Ballotpedia
  (State House district information based on U.S. Census Bureau's American Community Survey).

House
Government of Plymouth County, Massachusetts
Government of Bristol County, Massachusetts